The Bucharest Ring Motorway (or the Bucharest Belt Motorway), termed A0, is a motorway ring in construction around the city of Bucharest, the capital of Romania. It is intended to be the outer ring to the existing Bucharest Ring Road.

It is split into two sections: the South Ring Motorway and the North Ring Motorway. It will have a total distance of 100 km and will be a motorway connection between the existing A1, A2 and A3 motorways.

Currently, construction contracts are ongoing  for the  lot 1 and lot 2 of  southern half, while for the northern half three tenders were launched.

Sections

South section
The South Ring Motorway (52 km) was tendered as a concession contract in December 2012, that was supposed to be awarded in November 2013. Yet, a new tender was announced in July 2017, that shall be completed between the end of 2017 and the first half of 2018, with an estimated cost of 580 million euros. Construction works should take three years and a half to complete. It will run through the south of Bucharest, along the route of the Pan-European Corridor IV.

A tender for a segment of 17.5 km (15.5 km of the South section and 2.5 km of the North section), called lot 3, between the A1 motorway and the DN6 road was launched in July 2017 and awarded in April 2018, to the joint-venture Spedition UMB–Tehnostrade–Artera Proiect, with one year allowed for the design of the motorway and two and a half years for the construction works. However, the bid was challenged and awarded to a new constructor, the Greek company Aktor, in October 2018.

The rest of the South section was tendered on the same date as well, with both of the two bids awarded to the Turkish company Alsim Alarko: the contract for the segment of 16.3 km between the DN6 road and the CFR Line 902 (near Jilava), called lot 2, was signed in March 2019 and is due to be finished in 2022, while the bid for the segment of 16.9 km between the CFR Line 902 and the A2 motorway, called lot 1, was under challenge procedures until July 2019, with the contract being signed one month later.

North section
In June 2019, the 45 km of the Northern half were tendered for auction into three segments.

Openings timeline
All segments of the South Ring are under construction and planned to be opened in 2023.
Two of the 4 segments of the North Ring have been signed, with the entire North section expected to be finished by 2024.

Periods of works
In May 2019 the northern portion was auctioned following the works to start on June 10, 2019.
In August 2019 it was auctioned the motorway connection between the existing A1, there are currently no works on this portion.

See also
Roads in Romania
Transport in Romania

References

External links
Ministry of Transport – Bucharest By-Pass Motorway
Map of the South Ring Motorway

Proposed roads in Romania
Motorways in Romania